Labeobarbus semireticulatus is a species of ray-finned fish in the genus Labeobarbus is endemic to the Louvisi River in Gabon.

References 

Endemic fauna of Gabon
semireticulatus
Taxa named by Jacques Pellegrin
Fish described in 1924